The spotted rubber frog (Phrynomantis affinis) is a species of frog in the family Microhylidae.
It is found in Angola, Democratic Republic of the Congo, Namibia, Zambia, possibly Botswana, possibly Tanzania, and possibly Zimbabwe.
Its natural habitats are dry savanna, moist savanna, subtropical or tropical dry shrubland, intermittent freshwater lakes, and intermittent freshwater marshes.

References

Phrynomantis
Amphibians described in 1901
Taxonomy articles created by Polbot